Rabies is Finnish industrial metal band Ruoska's fifth album; it was released on 9 April 2008.

Track listing
Saarnaaja ('Preacher') - 4:56
Lihaa vasten lihaa ('Flesh Against Flesh') - 3:29
Helvettiin jäätynyt ('Frozen in Hell') - 3:59
Ei koskaan ('Never') - 4:12
Pirunkieli ('Devil's Tongue') - 3:39
Vankilani ('My Prison') - 4:56
Valtaa, väkivaltaa ('Power, Violence') - 3:18
Pakkomielle ('Obsession') - 3:37
Porttikielto taivaaseen ('Banned from Heaven') - 4:00
Sotasokea ('Warblind') - 4:18

Band members
During the album recording, these were the band members:
Patrik Mennander (vocals)
Anssi Auvinen (guitar)
Mika Kamppi (bass)
Sami Karppinen (drums)

Singles 
"Pirunkieli" ("Devil's tongue" in Finnish), the first single from the album, was released digitally on the band's official MySpace page in December 2007.

References

Rabies at Findance.com

External links
Ruoska International - English fansite
English fansite

Ruoska albums
2008 albums